The Tiger Warrior is an archaeological adventure novel by David Gibbins. First published in 2009, it is the fourth book in Gibbins' Jack Howard series. It has been published in 18 languages and was a New York Times bestseller .

International editions

Among its foreign language editions, The Tiger Warrior is entitled Tigres de Guerre in France (Editions First), and Guardians of the Secret (Φύλακες του Μυστικού) in the Greek edition.

External links
 David Gibbins' website

2005 British novels
British adventure novels
British thriller novels
Archaeology in popular culture
Headline Publishing Group books